Héctor Facundo (2 November 1937 – 13 November 2009) was an Argentine association football player.

Facundo started playing in 1956 at Racing Club de Avellaneda before moving to San Lorenzo de Almagro. With San Lorenzo he won the 1959 Argentine Primera División and took part in the 1960 Copa Libertadores where they reached the semi-finals before getting knocked out by Uruguayan side C.A. Peñarol. Facundo played at San Lorenzo until 1963 and later had a spell with Club Atlético Huracán.

With Argentina national football team Facundo played in the 1959 South American Championship in Ecuador where they finished runners-up behind Uruguay. At the tournament Facundo appeared in matches against Paraguay, Ecuador and Brazil.

Facundo was also called up to Argentina squad for the 1962 FIFA World Cup in Chile, where they were eliminated in the group stage. He appeared in their opening 1–0 win against Bulgaria, in which he scored the winning goal, and in Argentina's final group match versus Hungary.

References

External links

Héctor Facundo at BDFA.com.ar 

1937 births
2009 deaths
Argentine footballers
Argentina international footballers
1962 FIFA World Cup players
Argentine Primera División players
Racing Club de Avellaneda footballers
San Lorenzo de Almagro footballers
Club Atlético Huracán footballers
Burials at La Chacarita Cemetery
Association football forwards
Footballers from Buenos Aires